Harry Bidwell Ansted (December 17, 1893 – November 15, 1955) was a United States Army officer, pastor and educator, and the first president of Seoul National University.

Early life and education 
Born in Temperance, Michigan, Ansted attended Hillsdale College and earned a Bachelor of Business Administration from Greenville College. In 1923, he earned a Master of Arts degree from the University of Southern California.

Career 
He then became a Christian pastor and served in several churches in Michigan for five years. He went on to teach in Wessington Springs College, Los Angeles Pacific College, and Seattle Pacific College.

In 1944, near the end of the World War II, Ansted enlisted in the United States Army as an Army chaplain. After his service in Leyte, Philippines, he was transferred to Korea, a part of the United States Army Military Government in Korea. It was here, in 1946, that he became the first president of Seoul National University, a new national university established in place of Keijō Imperial University. He also created the official motto of the school, Veritas Lux Mea, which is still used to this day. Ansted was succeeded by Lee Choon-ho on October 24, 1947.

He was a member of the American Economic Association, the American History Society, and the Royal Economics Society.

References

1893 births
1955 deaths
United States Army chaplains
People from Temperance, Michigan
Hillsdale College alumni
University of Southern California alumni
Presidents of Seoul National University
Greenville College alumni
Seattle Pacific University faculty
World War II chaplains
20th-century American clergy
Military personnel from Michigan